Shakila Rahim Lamar, is a Ugandan businesswoman, public relations professional and corporate executive who was appointed as Head of Public Relations and Corporate Affairs at Uganda Airlines, the national carrier of that country, effective December 2021. Immediately before her current position, Shakila was the Head Corporate Communications at Uganda Road Fund.

Background and education
Shakila is a Ugandan national. She holds a Diploma in Law, awarded by the Law Development Centre, in Kampala. She also holds an Exexcutive Master of Business Administration, awarded by the Eastern and Southern African Management Institute (EASAMI). She is also an Associate Member of the Chartered Institute of Public Relations (CIPR) and is reportedly pursuing a Doctorate degree at an undisclosed university.

Career
At the time she took up employment at Uganda Airlines in December 2021, she had over 16 years of experience including the areas of  "leadership, customer care, government relations, risk management, media relations, corporate communications, and crisis communication". In addition to her work at the Uganda Road Fund, she previously worked in the same role in one of the agencies of the Uganda Ministry of Agriculture.

Other considerations
As of December 2021, Lamar is a member of the Public Relations Association of Uganda (PRAU). She also contemporaneously serves as the secretary to the Council of the Institute of Corporate Governance Uganda (ICGU).

See also
 Olive Birungi Lumonya
 Lilly Ajarova

References

External links
 Website of Uganda Airlines 

1983 births
Living people
21st-century Ugandan businesswomen
21st-century Ugandan businesspeople
Ugandan business executives
Eastern and Southern African Management Institute alumni
Law Development Centre alumni